Doge (usually  ,   or  ) is an Internet meme that became popular in 2013. The meme typically consists of a picture of Kabosu, a Shiba Inu dog, accompanied by multicolored text in Comic Sans font in the foreground. The text, representing a kind of internal monologue, is deliberately written in a form of broken English.

The meme is based on a 2010 photograph and became popular in late 2013, being named as Know Your Memes "top meme" of that year. The Shiba Inu had a notable presence in popular culture in late 2013, including a cryptocurrency based on Doge, the Dogecoin, launching in December of that year. Several online polls and media outlets recognized Doge as one of the best Internet memes of the 2010s.

Structure 
Doge uses two-word phrases in which the first word is almost always one of five modifiers ("so", "such", "many", "much", and "very"), and the departure from correct English is to use the modifier with a word that it cannot properly modify. For example, "Much respect. So noble." uses the Doge modifiers but is not "proper" Doge because the modifiers are used in a formally correct fashion; the Doge version would be "Much noble, so respect." In addition to these phrases, a Doge utterance often ends with a single word, most often "wow" but with "amaze" and "excite" also being used.

Since the inception of the meme, several variations and spin-offs have been created, including "liquified Doge", a variation wherein the dog's shape is morphed into other animals, and "ironic Doge", a version where the Doge character is put into ironic and uncharacteristic situations. The ironic Doge memes have spawned several other related characters, often dogs themselves, one of which is Cheems, another Shiba Inu who is typically characterized by a speech impediment that adds the letter "M" throughout its speech. 

Walter, a bull terrier character who is typically portrayed as liking "moster trucks"  and firetrucks, is another commonly recurring ironic Doge character. These memes are mostly present on subreddits like r/dogelore. One meme which became popular in 2020 was "Swole Doge vs. Cheems", in which a muscular Doge and a baby Cheems are depicted as something considered better in the past, and its modern version, respectively.

Origin and pronunciation 

, the female Shiba Inu featured in the original meme, is a pedigree dog who was sent to an animal shelter when her puppy mill shut down. She was adopted in 2008 by Japanese kindergarten teacher Atsuko Sato, and named after the citrus fruit kabosu because Sato thought she had a round face like the fruit. Another Shiba Inu featured in the meme is Suki, a female belonging to photographer Jonathan Fleming from San Francisco. His wife had accidentally put a scarf in the wash, making it shrink. He took a photograph of Suki wearing the scarf outside on a cold night in February 2010.

Kabosu was first pictured in a 2010 blog post by Sato; afterward, variations of the pictures using overlaid Comic Sans text were posted from a Tumblr blog, Shiba Confessions. However, the use of the intentionally misspelled "Doge" dates back to June 2005, when it was mentioned in an episode of Homestar Runners puppet series. The meme began to grow in popularity after it was used on Reddit in October 2010 in a post titled "LMBO LOOK @ THIS FUKKEN DOGE."

Some of the other characters used in the meme are based on photographs of real dogs. Cheems is based on an image of a dog named Balltze, from Hong Kong; he was adopted at the age of one and was nine years old in 2020. Walter is based on the bull terrier Nelson, who originally became popular in 2018 after his owner, Victoria Leigh, posted a picture of Nelson to Twitter, with the caption "When u open the front-facing camera on accident." In 2020, rumors of Nelson's death began to circulate the internet, although they turned out to be false.

In non-English speaking countries, "Doge" is occasionally pronounced  "dodge".

History and spread

Initial 2013 spread

Online searches for the meme began to increase in July 2013. In August 2013, images of the meme were spammed on Reddit's r/MURICA subreddit by 4chan's random imageboard, /b/. The meme was ranked at No. 12 on MTV's list of "50 Things Pop Culture Had Us Giving Thanks For" in 2013. io9 compared the internal dialog of the Shiba Inu dogs to lolspeak. On December 13, Doge was named the "top meme" of 2013 by Know Your Meme.

In late December 2013, members of the U.S. Congress produced material in the meme's style. The Huffington Post commented that Doge was "killed" because of the Congress members' usage of the meme.

In December 2013, the Dogecoin was introduced as a new cryptocurrency, making it the first cryptocurrency to be based on an Internet meme; the viral phenomenon, along with usage of the Comic Sans MS typeface, gave it "the Internet density of a large star" according to Medium writer Quinn Norton.

Continued popularity
By early 2014, Doge's popularity was sustained by Internet communities on social media, accompanied by the rapid growth and acceptance of Dogecoin. In April 2014, Doge experienced a second major media resurgence due to revelations of the Dogecoin community's intent to sponsor Josh Wise in NASCAR and place a picture of the Shiba Inu on his vehicle. The car features in downloadable content for the video game NASCAR '14. Media outlets have embraced the meme while reporting on the cryptocurrency and the car, with titles featuring phrases such as "so wow" and "very vroom".

A report on The Daily Dot in December 2016 found that Doge's popularity peaked in 2014 and then fell due to "overexposure and co-option by advertisers and mainstream 'normies'", but remained stable since then and returned to Tumblr's top 10 shared memes of the year in 2016.

For April Fools' Day in 2017, China Central Television published a hoax story of the death of Kabosu.

In 2021, the NFT of the original Doge meme was acquired by PleasrDAO and Doge NFT was fractionalized into $DOG token.

In 2022, during the Russian invasion of Ukraine, an online phenomenon and group dedicated to countering Russian propaganda and Russian disinformation called NAFO (or the North Atlantic Fella Organization), where participants, who refer themselves as "Fellas", use Doge as their avatar. In addition to posting pro-Ukraine memes, or ones mocking Russian war effort and strategy and "shitposting", the group also raises funds for the Ukrainian military and other pro-Ukrainian causes.

Cultural depictions

In advertising
In mid-2014, the advertisement agency DDB Stockholm had Doge featured prominently in an advertising campaign for the public transport company SL in Stockholm, Sweden. The advertisement concerned the company's special summer tickets, and featured Doge holding a public transport ticket in his mouth, with phrases such as "many summer", "such cheap" and "very buy".

Online
Google created a Doge Easter egg: when doge meme was entered into the YouTube search bar, all the site's text would be displayed in colorful Comic Sans, similar to the kind used by the meme. In January 2014, Sydney-based web developers Katia Eirin and Bennett Wong created Doge Weather, a weather website and mobile app incorporating the meme. Doge Weather reports the temperature and weather conditions based on the user's geographic location. In April 2014, Doge Weather became available as a mobile app for iOS 7. Mozilla's Servo project incorporated the meme into the project logo from May 2016 to February 2020.

In entertainment
In the video for "Weird Al" Yankovic's 2014 song "Word Crimes", a song about bad grammar, a Doge tweet is used to illustrate the types of bad grammar referenced in that part of the song.

In the 2015 video game The Legend of Zelda: Tri Force Heroes, a reference to the meme can be found in the North American version only. When examining one of the ancient bookshelves, the text reads "Still, coming here has at least afforded me the rare chance to explore these ancient ruins. So ancient. Such ruin." The reference was met with mixed views from fans of the series.

In 2015, the video game Just Cause 3 included a special mode that popped up text in the style of the meme in response to certain player actions.

In 2017, the video game Smite added a Doge skin for the goddess Skadi.

Reception and legacy
"Doge" was one of several additions to Dictionary.com in November 2015. The website defines it as not just the image macro and its variants, but also the form of "language" that it utilizes.

Several media publications included Doge on a list of memes that helped define Internet culture in the 2010s, and wrote on the meme's influence of further online developments, such as DoggoLingo and WeRateDogs. Evan McMurry of ABC News and Stacey Ritzen of The Daily Dot both ranked Doge as the number-one meme of the 2010s. In December 2019, Doge was voted as the best Internet meme of the 2010s on a poll held by The Tab, gaining 737 votes, or 22 percent of total votes cast. Voxs Aja Romano included Doge on a list of 11 memes "that captured the decade," writing that it took "cat memes to new, absurdist heights, an early hallmark of neo-Dadaist millennial humor."

The Japanese perception is remarkably different; Kabosu and Sato are known as pet and owner rather than a meme, and her blog was the fourth-most popular pet-related blog in the country as of December 2013. Reacting to the meme, she explained, "To be honest, some pictures are strange for me, but it's still funny! I'm very impressed with their skills and taste. Around me, nobody knows about the Doge meme. Maybe I don't understand memes very well, because I'm living such an analog life." Sato has also expressed that she had learned that "the risk of the internet is that anyone in the world can see my life on my blog". Fleming stated that in his experience, the Shiba Inu breed has become more recognized due to the meme. It was reported in late December 2022 that 17-year-old Kabosu was seriously ill with leukemia.

See also 
List of individual dogs
List of Internet phenomena

References

External links 

 Original blog post featuring Kabosu (moved from post on old blog)
 
 
 

2010s fads and trends
2010s photographs
Animals on the Internet
Color photographs
Computer-related introductions in 2013
Dogs in popular culture
Internet culture
Internet memes
Internet memes introduced in 2013
2020s fads and trends